Michael Zachary Myers (born November 7, 1983) is an American musician, singer, and songwriter who founded and is currently the lead singer and guitarist for the rock band The Fairwell. He is also the former bassist and current guitarist for the hard rock band Shinedown, and the manager of Memphis pop rock band Sore Eyes, as well as lead singer of Allen, Mack, Myers, & Moore.

Career
He has stated that, while growing up, his main guitar influences were Jimi Hendrix, Stevie Ray Vaughan, Jimmy Page, Phil Lynott and Damon Johnson.

The Fairwell
The Fairwell is a rock band from Memphis, Tennessee. The band was founded by lead singer and guitarist Zach Myers, a Beale Street based, internationally touring blues artist from age 14. The other band members have changed over the years, with the notable exception of long-time and current guitarist and vocalist Chris Allen, who played and started a fanbase on Beale Street at an early age.  Drummer Michael McManus is the most recent addition to the band, having joined in 2008.  The group has opened for dozens of major recording artists including 3 Doors Down and Hinder, and has appeared in numerous magazine, radio, television appearances, as recently as March 24, 2008 on CBS televisions "Live at 9".

Shinedown
Zach joined Shinedown as a touring rhythm guitarist in 2005, before becoming their temporary bassist after the departure of Brad Stewart in 2007. In early 2008, he assumed the role of permanent rhythm guitarist. On December 18, 2008 Nick Perri departed Shinedown, leaving Zach to assume the role of the band's rhythm and lead guitarist.

On March 23, 2010, Zach Myers appeared on the cover of guitar edge magazine.

Collaborations
Zach Myers toured with Saliva in 2004 and 2005 filling in for Dave Novotny. In 2011 Zach appeared as guest guitarist at Nonpoint concert playing their hit Bullet with a Name with them. On April 15, 2011 Zach joined Brother Cane as lead guitarist for their reunion show at Dallas International Guitar Festival.

In 2022 Myers collaborated with Hanson, in "Don't Let Me Down" the third single from their upcoming album Red Green Blue, in which he plays the guitar and appears in the video.

Management
Myers runs his own artist management company, Cursed Management Group. Myers made his first foray into artist management with the Memphis rock band Sore Eyes. After having seen the band play around the local area and been suitably impressed, he asked Sore Eyes to support Shinedown for a few sold-out shows at the Machine Shop in Flint, Michigan in December 2008. Unbeknownst to the band these performances were being used by Myers as an audition to see whether they could cut it as potential clients. According to vocalist Shi Eubank, after the shows Myers had said, "Well, the reason I brought you out here is that I wanted to see if you'd sink or swim in front of a crowd like this ... and you guys are out here doing the breaststroke." He then told the band that he would like to step in and work on the management end with them.

Equipment

Guitars
His first guitar was a Series 10 - Strat. Being a collector of vintage musical equipment, Myers currently owns over two hundred guitars of various makes.

PRS Guitars
Charcoal Burst PRS Singlecut
Zach Myers Signature PRS Singlecut 3 Humbuckers
3 Humbucker Silverburst PRS, 2nd prototype for his signature model
Royal Blue PRS Singlecut, Zach's favorite guitar and one of the first singlecut guitar PRS ever made
Gold Starla Bigsby, 59'/09' PRS pickups
PRS Mira
PRS NF-3
White PRS Hollowbody I
PRS Singlecut Hollowbody II
Fender
Black and Natural 72' Telecaster Thinline
Gibson
Black Les Paul Custom
Red Double Cut Les Paul Jr.
Original 58 Les Paul Burst finish
Taylor Guitars
Custom Grand Symphony * Built for Zach
GS Custom 12th Fret
916 W/ Custom Inlay
Grand Concert Non Cutaway
Koa T-5
GS 8
814 Standard
ESP M-II Custom + Mark IV
Custom Built Bill Nash Telecaster
Saint Blues

Basses
LTD M-IV BTT-MKAFBS Vinyl

Strings
SIT - Nickelwounds

Amplifiers
Diezel Herbert
Hiwatt HH-100
Fuchs Mantis 
Diamond Phantom

Picks
IntuneGP
 InTune 0.73MM

Effects
GCX Pedal Board
Samson UR-5D
Boss DC-2 Chorus Pedal
Digitech Hyper Phase
Digitech Whammy IV
Dunlop Bob Bradshaw Boost/Overdrive (Zach only uses the boost)
Boss CS-3 Compression Sustainer
Ibanez TS-9 Tube Screamer
Electro-Harmonix XO Micro Pog Octave Pedal
Line 6 DL4 Delay Pedal
Furman Voltage Regulator

Guitar Rig & Signal Flow
A detailed gear diagram of Zach Myers' 2011 Shinedown guitar rig is well-documented.

References

1983 births
Living people
People from Memphis, Tennessee
American heavy metal guitarists
Guitarists from Tennessee
Brother Cane members
Shinedown members
21st-century American bass guitarists